Ko Bu-beng (born 23 July 1937) is a Taiwanese weightlifter. He competed at the 1956 Summer Olympics and the 1960 Summer Olympics.

References

1937 births
Living people
Taiwanese male weightlifters
Olympic weightlifters of Taiwan
Weightlifters at the 1956 Summer Olympics
Weightlifters at the 1960 Summer Olympics
Sportspeople from Manila
Medalists at the 1958 Asian Games
Asian Games gold medalists for Chinese Taipei
Weightlifters at the 1958 Asian Games
Asian Games medalists in weightlifting
20th-century Taiwanese people